Fenderi-ye Nam Avar Kola (also Romanized as Fenderī-ye Nām Āvar Kolā; also known as Fenderī-ye Nām Āvar) is a village in Balatajan Rural District, in the Central District of Qaem Shahr County, Mazandaran Province, Iran. At the 2006 census, its population was 466, in 125 families.

References 

Populated places in Qaem Shahr County